Paradelphomyia is a genus of crane flies in the family Limoniidae.

Species
Subgenus Oxyrhiza de Meijere, 1946
P. aberdarica Alexander, 1956
P. aequatorialis (Alexander, 1944)
P. alticola Alexander, 1956
P. amabilis Alexander, 1954
P. americana (Alexander, 1912)
P. angustistyla Alexander, 1970
P. annulipes Alexander, 1960
P. ariana (Alexander, 1930)
P. bhava Alexander, 1956
P. bigladia Alexander, 1970
P. bilobata Alexander, 1957
P. brachyphallus Alexander, 1956
P. brevifurca Savchenko, 1976
P. cayuga (Alexander, 1912)
P. cerina (Alexander, 1936)
P. chosenica Alexander, 1950
P. costaricensis (Alexander, 1922)
P. cycnea Stary & Freidberg, 2007
P. czizekiana Stary, 1971
P. dalei (Edwards, 1939)
P. deprivata Alexander, 1954
P. destituta (Alexander, 1945)
P. dichromata Alexander, 1965
P. dissita Alexander, 1960
P. distivena Alexander, 1954
P. dolonigra Alexander, 1970
P. ecalcarata (Edwards, 1938)
P. faurei (Alexander, 1923)
P. flavescens (Brunetti, 1911)
P. furcata (Brunetti, 1912)
P. fuscula (Loew, 1873)
P. hkayamensis Alexander, 1965
P. indulcata Alexander, 1958
P. interposita Savchenko, 1976
P. issikina (Alexander, 1930)
P. krisna Alexander, 1957
P. laterostriata Savchenko, 1976
P. latissima (Alexander, 1932)
P. macracantha Alexander, 1957
P. maddocki (Alexander, 1948)
P. majuscula (Alexander, 1936)
P. manopi Alexander, 1956
P. marginipuncta Alexander, 1974
P. megacera Alexander, 1958
P. mexicana (Alexander, 1940)
P. minuta (Alexander, 1911)
P. minutoides Alexander, 1954
P. mitra Alexander, 1953
P. morelosensis (Alexander, 1946)
P. myriacantha Alexander, 1965
P. nebulosa (de Meijere, 1913)
P. newar Alexander, 1958
P. nielseni (Kuntze, 1919)
P. nigrina (Lackschewitz, 1940)
P. nimbicolor Alexander, 1950
P. nipponensis (Alexander, 1924)
P. nubifera Alexander, 1954
P. oaxacensis (Alexander, 1946)
P. pacifica (Alexander, 1944)
P. paucimacula Alexander, 1956
P. perumbrosa Alexander, 1950
P. platymera Alexander, 1972
P. pleuralis (Dietz, 1921)
P. pleurolinea Alexander, 1950
P. polysticta (Edwards, 1934)
P. prayooni Alexander, 1954
P. pugilis Alexander, 1973
P. pygmaea Savchenko, 1973
P. recurvans Alexander, 1956
P. reducta (Alexander, 1938)
P. ruficolor Alexander, 1965
P. senilis (Haliday, 1833)
P. sierrensis Alexander, 1958
P. subnebulosa (Alexander, 1936)
P. subterminalis Alexander, 1958
P. tritumula Alexander, 1965
P. ugandae (Riedel, 1914)
P. umbrosa (Edwards, 1916)
P. venezolana Alexander, 1950
P. vumbensis (Alexander, 1946)
Subgenus Paradelphomyia Alexander, 1936
P. crossospila (Alexander, 1936)

References

Catalogue of the Craneflies of the World

Limoniidae
Tipuloidea genera